The Lake Wellesley is a lake in Yukon, Canada with an area of 72 km².
The lake is popular for angling.

References

Lakes of Yukon